John Paul II Catholic School or Saint John Paul II Catholic School may refer to:

Canada
 St. John Paul II Catholic School (Stony Plain, Alberta) - Evergreen Catholic Schools
 St. John Paul II Catholic School (Ottawa, Ontario) - Ottawa Catholic School Board

United States
 St. John Paul II Catholic School (South Carolina) (Okatie, South Carolina)
 John Paul II Catholic School (Houston) (Houston, Texas)
 St. John Paul II Catholic School (Lecanto, Florida) - Roman Catholic Diocese of Saint Petersburg
 St. John Paul II Catholic School (Sellersburg, Indiana in the Louisville, Kentucky area) - Roman Catholic Archdiocese of Indianapolis
 John Paul II Catholic School (Overland Park, Kansas in the Kansas City, Missouri area) - Roman Catholic Archdiocese of Kansas City in Kansas
 St. John Paul II Catholic School (Southern Pines, North Carolina) - Roman Catholic Diocese of Raleigh
 John Paul II Catholic School (Lincoln Park, Michigan in the Detroit area) - Roman Catholic Archdiocese of Detroit
 St. John Paul II Catholic School (Gillette, Wyoming) - Roman Catholic Diocese of Cheyenne